Chulym or Cholym can refer to:
Chulyms, an ethnic group in Russia
Chulym language
Chulym (Ob), a river in Krasnoyarsk Krai and Tomsk Oblast, Russia; a tributary of the Ob
Chulym (Lake Malye Chany), a river in Novosibirsk Oblast, Russia
Chulym (inhabited locality), name of several inhabited localities in Russia